Bilsi is a town and a municipal board in Badaun district in the state of Uttar Pradesh, India.  It is located to the southwest of Bareilly and has its own tehsil. According to Census 2011 information the sub-district code of Bilsi block is 00780. Total area of Bilsi is 361 km2 including 332.13 km2 rural area and 28.60 km2 urban area. Bilsi has a population of 4,04,198 peoples. There are 67,758 houses in the sub-district. There are about 204 villages in Bilsi bloc

Geography
It has an average elevation of 180 metres (590 feet).

Demographics
As of 2010 India census, Bilsi had a population of 26,320. Males constitute 53% of the population and females 47%. Bilsi has an average literacy rate of 45%, lower than the national average of 59.5%; with male literacy of 52% and female literacy of 37%. 18% of the population is under 6 years of age.

Banking
There are several available banks in the city:

State Bank of India (with ATM)
Bank of Baroda ( with ATM)
Punjab National Bank (with ATM)
Sarva U.P Gramin Bank
Oriental Bank Of Commerce (With ATM )

Transport
Bilsi is strategically located and is well connected by road.  It is situated on State Highway no 51 Badaun - Bijnor. It is well connected by roads to some of the famous cities like Agra, Mathura, Bareilly, Moradabad, Ghaziabad & Delhi.

Major Degree College 
 Swarn Academy for Future Education, sateti
 Maharana Pratap Government degree college

Major Hospitals 
 Narendra-Gayatri Hospital
 Ranjana Hospital 
 Government Hospital
 Gandhi Lineage Hospital
Baba Mission Hospital
 Raj Nursing Home

References

Cities and towns in Budaun district